Morales-Sanchez is a census-designated place (CDP) in Zapata County, Texas, United States. The population was 84 at the 2010 census.

Geography
Morales-Sanchez is located at  (26.787616, -99.114689).

Demographics
As of the census of 2000, there were 95 people, 35 households, and 26 families residing in the CDP. The population density was 26.3 people per square mile (10.1/km2). There were 74 housing units at an average density of 20.5/sq mi (7.9/km2). The racial makeup of the CDP was 96.84% White, 3.16% from other races. Hispanic or Latino of any race were 91.58% of the population.

There were 35 households, out of which 25.7% had children under the age of 18 living with them, 62.9% were married couples living together, 11.4% had a female householder with no husband present, and 25.7% were non-families. 22.9% of all households were made up of individuals, and 17.1% had someone living alone who was 65 years of age or older. The average household size was 2.71 and the average family size was 3.23.

In the CDP, the population was spread out, with 21.1% under the age of 18, 10.5% from 18 to 24, 16.8% from 25 to 44, 27.4% from 45 to 64, and 24.2% who were 65 years of age or older. The median age was 48 years. For every 100 females, there were 93.9 males. For every 100 females age 18 and over, there were 108.3 males.

The median income for a household in the CDP was $20,313, and the median income for a family was $20,417. Males had a median income of $0 versus $0 for females. The per capita income for the CDP was $7,485. There were no families and 10.9% of the population living below the poverty line, including no under eighteens and 26.3% of those over 64.

References

Census-designated places in Texas
Census-designated places in Zapata County, Texas